Hat Rin is a peninsular beach area and town on the southern tip of Ko Pha-ngan, an island in the Gulf of Thailand. Its two main beaches are Sunset Beach (Hat Rin Nai) to the south and the larger Sunrise Beach (Hat Rin Nok) to the north. A Full Moon Party takes place on Sunrise Beach each month.

The town and beach first became popular for backpacker tourism since the 1980s. As the popularity of the beach and Full Moon Party have increased, the town has grown to accommodate the new visitors. The town is centred on Chicken Corner, a crossroads and popular meeting spot.

Entertainment 

Most of the nightlife in the town is centred on beachfront spots. The original beach bars, Drop-In Bar and Cactus Bar attract the largest crowds, with nightly drinks promotions and fire shows. Here, popular chart tunes, R&B and club classics entertain the crowds. Other beach bars include Vinyl Club, Zoom (both playing psytrance, the original Full Moon Party style of music), Orchid (playing Drum and Bass and Jungle) and Boom Boom Bar (playing deeper house and trance music).

Fire shows 
Apart from the music and bars on the beaches of Hat Rin, a regular feature of the Hat Rin are the nightly fire shows put on by individuals at the Cactus and Drop-In Bars. Various individuals specialize in the arts of Poi and Staff, performing tricks to entertain the crowds. The firesticks are ropes twisted around sticks and soaked in diesel which, when burned, emits choking clouds of toxic stench. Many tourists are inspired by the shows and opt to take up daytime lessons before joining the evening fire shows.

Pollution 
Hat Rin is polluted with litter, but given the constant parties, it is relatively clean. There are sewage works and the sewerage is not pumped into the sea. However, owing to the vast number of tourists frequently visiting the island to enjoy the Full Moon Party, the amount of trash is unbearable. The following day can be described as total carnage. Intoxicated travellers are sleeping off their hangover, whilst the beach is covered in plastic cups, bottles, and other plastic materials.

Popular culture 
Hat Rin Beach has featured in many media such as the Danny Boyle film adaption of The Beach, The Backpacker by John Harris, and songs by The Klaxons and by S-Kay.

References

External links

Beaches of Thailand
Geography of Surat Thani province
Tourist attractions in Surat Thani province